The Chantry House is a house at 34 Church Street, Steyning, West Sussex, England

It is a Grade II* listed building, built in the 18th century.

There is a tablet on the building, upon which is inscribed "William Butler Yeats, 1859–1939, wrote many of his later poems in this house".

The artist Gluck (Hannah Gluckstein) lived there with her longtime lover, Edith Shackleton Heald, who died in 1976 followed by Gluck in 1978.

As of 2007, the house is lived in by Gluck's former doctor.

References

Grade II* listed buildings in West Sussex